Svevn is the third studio album by the Norwegian band Gåte. The album was released in 2018. It was the band's first studio album since 2004's Iselilja.

Track listing
 "Kom no disjka" (Alf Hulbækmo, Gåte, Ronny Janssen)
 "Bannlyst" (Gåte, Knut Buen)
 "Tonen" (Gåte, Buen)
 "Åsmund Frægdegjæva" (Gjermund Landrø, Gåte, Kenneth Kapstad)
 "Isdalskvinnen" (Gåte, Buen)
 "Fanitullen" (Gåte, Buen)
 "Horpa" (Gåte, Kristoffer Lo)
 "Svevn" (Gåte, Buen)
 "Draumeslagjè" (Gåte, Jonathan Altieri, Buen)
 "Alvorsleiken" (Gåte, Buen)

Personnel
Gåte
 Gunnhild Sundli - vocals
 Sveinung Sundli - fiddle, keyboard, vocals
 Magnus Børmark - guitar
 Jon Even Schärer - drums
 Mats Paulsen - bass

Technical personnel
 Ronny Janssen - production
 Christer André Cederberg - mixing
 Morten Lund - mastering
 Håvard Løvnes - album art
 Magnus Rakeng - album art design
 Terje Pedersen - A&R

Charts

References

External links
 
 

2018 albums
Gåte albums